Mu Epsilon Kappa is an organization that "strives to create a safe and accepting environment of inter- and intra-cultural communication in which people are welcome to express themselves and explore their interests without fear of ridicule or persecution".

History 
The Mu Epsilon Kappa Society started at the University of North Texas in the 1980s as an anime club called Northstar. The name later changed to Mu Epsilon Kappa in 1995 after it was taken over by recently transferred students who had been members of the club by the same name at Texas Tech. Eventually the two clubs, despite the shared name, broke off affiliation. In 2003, a new set of officers were elected on the promise of reforming the club—instituting a more democratic system, expanding club events, and prompting the club to begin taking part in campus events and service projects. Over the next few years, the club membership expanded from a dozen to over a hundred members.

In 2007, they joined with the anime club at Mississippi State University to form the Mu Epsilon Kappa Society, with the goal of creating a national network of clubs designed to provide a haven for nerdy people to meet others like them. Over the next year, four more university clubs joined Mu Epsilon Kappa. By 2009 the society had expanded to over a dozen chapters in several states.

Activities 
Mu Epsilon Kappa participates in several anime conventions, where they host events, cultural activities, and hold leadership seminars; as well as hosting alumni gatherings. Many MEK chapters also participate in local community activities and service projects.

Chapters 
Chapters of  include the following.  Active chapters are noted in bold, inactive chapters noted in italics.

There are presently no provisional chapters (~colonies).

References

External links 
Mu Epsilon Kappa Society

Student societies in the United States
Anime and manga fandom
University of North Texas